The Cambridge Center for Adult Education (CCAE), a non-profit corporation in Cambridge, Massachusetts, has been teaching adult education courses at 42 Brattle Street since taking over the building from the Cambridge Social Union in 1938.

The CCAE is housed in two historic buildings, the William Brattle House (1727) at 42 Brattle Street and the Dexter Pratt House (1808) at 54 Brattle Street.

History 
The Cambridge Social Union (CSU), founded in 1871 and formally incorporated in 1876, taught classes for adults in the former Brattle house which it had moved into in 1889 after purchasing it. The courses included literacy classes and general classes taught by Harvard College and Radcliffe College students and faculty.

CSU withstood the financial troubles of the First World War and the Great Depression. However, a 1937 feasibility study showed that the organization was in trouble. In 1938, in conjunction with the Boston Center for Adult Education, the Cambridge Social Union became the Cambridge Center for Adult Education. It offered evening courses to local residents and in 1941 became an independently run organization.

Course offerings
In the spring semester of 2011, the CCAE offered courses in the following areas:

 Arts
 Business
 Computers
 Crafts
 Dance
 ESL
 Events
 Fiber Arts
 Film, Photography and Video
 Food
 Fun and Games
 History and Contemporary Issues
 Homes and Gardens
 Investing
 Languages
 Lecture Series
 Life Issues
 Literature
 Mind and Body
 Music
 Science, Philosophy and Religion
 Sports and Exercise
 Theater
 Travel
 Wine and Spirits
 Work Life
 Writing

References

Further reading 
 "Cambridge Social Union", The Harvard Crimson, Monday, October 6, 1902

External links 
 Cambridge Center for Adult Education website

Adult education in the United States
Cambridge, Massachusetts
Education in Middlesex County, Massachusetts
Organizations based in Cambridge, Massachusetts